Tito Cabral Júnior (born 28 July 1995) is a Bissau-Guinean professional footballer who plays as a right-back for Portuguese club Varzim and the Guinea-Bissau national team.

Club career
Tito Júnior is a youth product of Cartaxo and Leiria. He began his senior career with Naval, before moving to Sertanense. On 9 June 2020, he transferred to Trofense, helping them achieve promotion to the Liga Portugal 2 in 2022. He made his professional debut with Trofense in a 2–0 Liga Portugal 2 win over Benfica B on 28 January 2022.

International career
Tito Júnior was first called up to the Guinea-Bissau national team for a set of friendlies in March 2022. He debuted with Guinea-Bissau in a friendly 3–0 win over Equatorial Guinea on 23 March 2022.

References

External links
 

1995 births
Living people
Sportspeople from Bissau
Bissau-Guinean footballers
Guinea-Bissau international footballers
Association football fullbacks
Associação Naval 1º de Maio players
Sertanense F.C. players
C.D. Trofense players
Varzim S.C. players
Campeonato de Portugal (league) players
Liga Portugal 2 players
Bissau-Guinean expatriate footballers
Bissau-Guinean expatriate sportspeople in Portugal
Expatriate footballers in Portugal